Teresa Pellegrino (born January 26, 1975) is an Italian chemist who is Professor of Chemistry at the Istituto Italiano di Tecnologia. Her research considers nanomaterials for biomedical applications. She was appointed Associate Editor of Nanoscale in 2022.

Early life and education 
Pellegrino was born in Grumo Appula. She was an undergraduate student at the University of Bari, where she completed her undergraduate and master's degrees. Pellegrino remained in Bari for her doctoral research, specialising in chemical synthesis. She worked under the supervision of Paul Alivisatos and Wolfgang Parak, and spent part of her studentship at the University of California, Berkeley. She was awarded a Marie Curie Fellowship and spent one year at the Center for NanoScience in Munich.

Research and career 
Pellegrino started her independent academic career at the National Nanotechnology Lab, which was part of the National Research Council Institute for the Physics of Matter. She studied the synthesis of colloidal nanocrystals and explored how they could be used in cellular studies. The National Nanotechnology Laboratory became the Nanoscience Institute in 2010, and Pellgrino was appointed to a permanent position. She was made a permanent staff scientist at the National Nanotechnology Lab in 2014.

Pellegrino's research considers nanomaterials for biomedical applications, including drug delivery and hyperthermia. In 2022, she was appointed Associate Editor of Nanoscale. She was supported by the European Research Council to develop magnetic nanoparticles that accumulate near metastatic tumours. These nanoparticles can be used to treat cancer, either through hyperthermia therapy or targeted drug delivery.

Awards and honours 
 2009 Italian Chemical Society Primo Levi Award
 2012 Chemical Communications Emerging Investigator
 2022 European Research Council Consolidator Grant

Selected publications

References 

1975 births
Living people
People from Apulia
20th-century Italian chemists
University of Bari alumni
Italian women scientists